NA-258 Gwadar-cum-Kechis a constituency for the National Assembly of Pakistan. It covers southern parts of the district of Kech and whole District Gwadar in the province of Balochistan. The constituency was created in 2022 out of NA-272 (Kech-cum-Gwadar) by taking out Kech District and making it a separate constituency.

Assembly Segments

Members of Parliament

Since 2018: NA-271 Kech

Election 2018

General elections were held on 25 July 2018.

See also
NA-257 Hub-cum-Lasbela-cum-Awaran
NA-259 Panjgur-cum-Kech

References 

Kech